Hellmuth Ladies' College (founded September 1869; closed 1899) was a private college for women in London, Ontario.  The college was founded by Reverend Isaac Hellmuth and was inaugurated by Prince Arthur.  The college had no official connection with a church; but under the patronage of its founder and namesake, it was thoroughly Anglican.  Princess Louise became its patroness on her visit in 1878.  The college was devoted to the study of arts and sciences.  It was located on Richmond Street North, just south of Windermere Road on the hill overlooking the Thames River.  Hellmuth Ladies' College was complemented by Hellmuth College — for young men, founded 1865 — also of London, Ontario. Hellmuth Ladies' College closed sometime between 1899 and 1901.  The properties were acquired by the Sisters of St. Joseph and transformed into Mount St. Joseph Orphanage.

Property 
The land
In 1867, Isaac Hellmuth purchased 150 acres with a hill overlooking the Thames River, and commissioned the design and construction of Hellmuth Ladies’ College.

The main building
The main building was designed by Gundry & Langley, a Toronto-based architectural firm headed by Thomas Gundry (1830–1869) and Henry Langley (1836–1907). Since the closing of the college in 1899, the building served as a convent and orphanage.  It stood until 1976, when it was demolished. Mount St. Joseph Academy for girls continued in that location until 1985.  As of 2011, the building and its grounds are the official home of Windermere On The Mount, a retirement residence operated by Revera.

The main building took on a new role in 1899, when it was purchased by the Sisters of St. Joseph, a Roman Catholic order of sisters dedicated to caring for orphans and the elderly, educating young girls, and ministering to the poor. Under its new name, Mount St. Joseph Mother House, the building and property served as both an orphanage and a convent for the sisters.

The chapel
Isaac Hellmuth erected a small chapel, just a short walk from the main building, and named it St. Anne's Chapel, in honor of the then Lady Principal, Anne Mills.

Norwood House
Residence of Bishop Hellmuth.

Diplomas, certificates, medals 
Hellmuth Ladies' College conferred diplomas, certificates of standing, and medals. Silver medals were awarded for general proficiency; silver and gold medals were awarded for proficiency in special subjects, including divinity, mathematics, science, and languages.

Administration and selected faculty 

Principals
 1869–1872: Ann Mills (1810–1898) – Principal
 1872–187?: Rev. Irwin – Principal
 1872–1874: Rev. Ganon, B.S. Huntingdon, M.A. – Principal
 1874–1883: Rev. Henry Faulkner Darnell (1831–1915) – Principal
 1883–1899: Rev. Edward Noble English (1851–1918) – Principal
 1878–1880: Rev. James Johnson Hill, M.A. (1832–1896) – Resident Principal and Chaplain for 18 months, beginning around the middle of 1878
 1870: Major Evans

 Lady Principals
 1875–1882: Lucy Hannah Clinton (1846–1932) – Lady Principal
 1872–187?: Mrs. Irwin – Lady Principal

Lady Superintendents
 1875: Lucy Hannah Clinton (1846–1932)
 1877: Miss McLellan 
 1882: Miss H.G. Wight, Diploma of Cambridge, England

Literary Department
 Rev. Edward Noble English, M.A. (1851–1918) – Professor of Mental Philosophy and Physics
 Rev. J. S. Thomas, M.A. – Professor of Classical and English Literature
 Rev. Charles B. Guillemont, B.A., D.D., Ph.D. (1828–1910) – Professor of Modern Languages
 1879–1880: Rev. William Minter Seaborne (1828–1913) – Professor of Natural Sciences
 The Rev. George Bloomfield Sage, B.A., B.D. (1856–1938) – Classics and Mathematics
 1889–1896: Miss Martha H. H. Wray (1862–1947) – teacher of German, English, and mathematics
 Miss Henrietta B. English (1864–1946) – English Subjects

Academic subjects
 Miss E. Henstridge

Music Department
 1883–1888: William Caven Barron, Esq. (1864–1936) – Professor of Piano, Organ, and Music History
 1883–1885: William Waugh Lauder (1857–1931) – Musical Director, Professor of Piano, Music Theory, and Music History
 1885–1899: Thomas W. Martin, Esq. (1861–1943) – Musical Director, Professor of Piano, Harmony, and Music History
 Miss Nelda J. Von Seyfried (born 1856) – Professor of Singing
 Roselle Pococke, Esq. (1859–1925) – Professor of Violin 
 1889–1899: Waldemar Arthur Blüthner, Esq. (1862–19??) – Professor of Piano and Harmony
 Stinson W. Wilson – Professor of Organ
 Madame Hausch – Professor of Violin
 Miss. K. Moore – Professor of Singing and Organ
 1874–1876: Kate Sara Chittenden (1856–1949) – Professor of Piano
 1870–188?: Lucy Hannah Clinton (1846–1932) – Musical Directress (1881), Professor of Piano, Lady Superintendent in 1875, Music Directress in 1877
 Miss Anna M. Diller (born 1868; married Edwin D. Starbuck) – teacher of piano
 Ida Louisa English (1869–1937), 1900 marriage to Corvin Weld (1868–1942) – Professor of Piano, Organ, and Italian
 Miss M. Raymond – piano
 1869: Frances Josephine Hatton (1840–1906), 1871 marriage to Charles Greenwood Moore, MD (1818–1886) – Composer, Professor of Composition and Singing (daughter of English composer John Liptrot Hatton)

Art Department
 1883–1892: Julian Ruggles Seavey, Esq. (1857–1940) – Director and Professor of Painting, Modelling, Carving, Decorative Art, and Design
 Miss E. Burwell – Drawing and Crayon
 Miss L. A. M. Jones – Modelling, Carving, and Decorative Art
 Martha Justina Hardwick (née Thomas; 1854–1917), 1874 marriage to William James Anderson (died 1887), 1887 marriage to John Wesley Hardwick (1855–1923)
 Mrs. A. Kenly, Art Needlework
 mid-1870s: William Lees Judson (1842–1928), drawing and painting
 Caroline Farncomb (1859–1951) – painting

Elocution Department
 Rev. Edward Noble English, M.A. (1851–1918) – Director
 1889–1894: Elizabeth (Libby) Alberta Oakley, B.L. (1862–1961), 1903 marriage to Walter E. Chrysler

Business Department
 William Charles Coo (1861–1950) – Professor of Shorthand

Etiquette Department, Physical Culture, Hygiene, etc.
 Mary Stoughton English (née Mulkins; born 1851), wife of Rev. Edward Noble English – Director
 Friend Richard Eccles, M.D. (who lived from 1843–1924) – Sanitary Science

Ladies' Drill, Department
 C. Major Darnley – Department and Family
 G. B. Dayton – Dancing
 1884–1999: John Fulcher (born 1850) – Riding and Driving

Miscellaneous faculty
 Frances "Fanny" Barbara Moule (1850–1917), 1880 marriage to Professor James Edward Wells, M.A., LL.D.  (1838–1898); 1904 marriage to Rev. Oates Charles Symonds Wallace (1856–1947)
 Edith Fitzgerald (née Edith Mary Jones; 1844–1928), 1864 marriage to Frederick Ardiel Fitzgerald (1840–1924)
 Constance Meredith (1865–1967), daughter of William Ralph Meredith, wife of George Armstrong Peters 
 Maude Cloudman Hudson, married to William Hamilton Merritt, Esq., M.D., C.M., R.C.P.S., Edin (1865–1924)
 Buzzie Gurd (aka Laurie Buzzel Gurd, née Phoebe Buzzel Gurd; 1872–1895)
 Miss Hattie English

Notable alumnae 
 Victoria Grace Blackburn (1865–1928), journalist and author
 Kate Sara Chittenden (1856–1949), professor of music; received the Dufferin Bronze Medal for Art in 1873,
 C. Lucile Dora, Professor of the Romance Languages and Literature, University of Oklahoma
 Evelyn Johnson (1856–1937), poet
 Maggie Langdell (née Margaret Ellen Huson; 1856–1907), 1875 diploma from Hellmuth, 1880 marriage to Christopher Columbus Langdell (1826–1926), Dean of Harvard Law School
 Madge Macbeth (née Madge Hamilton Lyons; 1881–1965), author and first woman president of the Canadian Authors Association
 Marian Osborne (née Marian Georgina Francis; 1871–1931), poet
 Anna Diller Starbuck (1868–1929), professor of music

Publications 
 The Hellmuth World, the newspaper of Hellmuth Ladies' College
 Notable contributors:
 Louise Amelia Knapp Smith Clappe (1819–1906)
 "Our Summer In The Valley of the Moon," successive issues, beginning May 28, 1881; 
 "The Lennox Library," April 2, 1881
 "Unconscious Plagiarisms," June 18, 1881

Student organizations 
Chi Omega, a U.S. based sorority, chartered its Phi chapter at Hellmuth Ladies' College in 1899.  Its one-year presence at Hellmuth stands as Chi Omega's only international expansion in the sorority's  years of existence. and Hellmuth's only Greek sorority.

References 
Notes

Inline citations

External links 
 "The Western University, London, Ontario," The Illustrated London News, November 23, 1878 (copy at Google Books)
 Architect's drawing of the Hellmuth Ladies' College building  elevation, June 23, 1868, courtesy of the Toronto Public Library
 Records of Hellmuth Ladies' College, Huron Diocese Archives

External links

Educational institutions established in 1869
Defunct universities and colleges in Canada
Schools in London, Ontario
Former women's universities and colleges in Canada
1869 establishments in Canada
Women in Ontario